Juan Martín Jauregui (born in Mar de Plata, Argentina), is an Argentine actor, who currently resides in Mexico city, Mexico since 1999, known for participating in several telenovelas of Telemundo and TV Azteca.

Filmography

Film roles

Television roles

References

External links 

Argentine male film actors
Argentine male telenovela actors
Living people
Year of birth missing (living people)